The King (French: Le roi) is a 1936 French comedy film directed by Pierre Colombier and starring Victor Francen, Raimu and Gaby Morlay. King Jean IV of Cerdagne visits Paris to sign an important treaty where he becomes involved with an actress and a dishonest Senator.

The film's sets were designed by the art director Jacques Colombier.

Cast
 Victor Francen as Le roi Jean IV de Cerdagne - en visite à Paris  
 Raimu as M. Bourdier - un riche industriel et sénateur qui reçoit le Roi 
 Gaby Morlay as Marthe Bourdier - la femme de l'industriel  
 Elvire Popesco as Thérèse Marnix - une actrice célèbre 
 Hélène Robert as Suzette Bourdier  
 Christian Argentin as Gabrier  
 Paul Amiot as Lelorrain  
 Gaston Dubosc as L'évêque  
 Albert Duvaleix as Cormeau  
 Jean Gobet as Rivelot  
 Philippe Hersent as Sernin de Chamarande  
 Georges Péclet as Fouchart 
 Frédéric Duvallès as M. Blond 
 Marguerite de Morlaye as La marquise de Chamarande  
 Edith Gallia 
 Anthony Gildès as Le président des restrictions 
 Gustave Hamilton
 André Lefaur as Le marquis de Chamarande

References

Bibliography 
 Andrews, Dudley. Mists of Regret: Culture and Sensibility in Classic French Film. Princeton University Press, 1995.

External links 
 

1936 films
French comedy films
1936 comedy films
1930s French-language films
Films directed by Pierre Colombier
Films set in Paris
French films based on plays
French black-and-white films
1930s French films